Bloomberg TV Malaysia is 24-hour Malaysia's first business news channel in English. Launched on April 11, 2015, it is owned by Emmedia Ventures Sdn Bhd, chaired by Malaysian businessman Tan Sri Mohd Effendi Norwawi (former owner of NTV7) and helmed by media industry veteran Michael Chan.

The operations are located in Kota Damansara, Malaysia with a broadcast facility. Bloomberg TV Malaysia's newsroom is supported by the Bloomberg Network to provide business news with a Malaysian perspective. The channel is accessible on multiple platforms, providing live TV streaming. It currently airs two shows on weekdays, 'Dashboard' at 1pm and ‘Moving Malaysia’ at 6pm.

Platforms
Bloomberg TV Malaysia is made available on multiple platforms. The channel is available on Astro Ch519, Malaysia's largest pay TV service provider. The channel provides user mobility to access LIVE TV as well as content through the Bloomberg TV Malaysia mobile app or on its official website.

Programming
Bloomberg TV Malaysia's programs and content cover business, financial, and economic news stories from Malaysia and around the world. But in July 2016, it went off air after its broadcasting from Astro was ended.

References
 Bloomberg Launches Bloomberg Television Malaysia, www.bloomberg.com
 Bloomberg TV Malaysia Confident on Being Top Channel, www.sundaytimes.com
 Bloomberg Television Malaysia Launches, www.marketingmagazine.com.my

Bloomberg L.P.
Television stations in Malaysia
Television channels and stations established in 2015